Bulli Shire was a local government area in the Illawarra region of New South Wales, Australia.

Bulli Shire was proclaimed on 7 March 1906, one of 134 shires created after the passing of the Local Government (Shires) Act 1905. 

The shire offices were in Bulli. Other urban areas in the shire included Austinmer, Helensburgh and Woonona.

The shire was amalgamated with the then City of Wollongong, Municipality of North Illawarra and Municipality of Central Illawarra to form Municipality of Greater Wollongong on 24 September 1947.

References

Former local government areas of New South Wales
1906 establishments in Australia
1947 disestablishments in Australia